Napierville was a provincial electoral district in the Montérégie region of Quebec, Canada.

It was created for the 1867 election (and an electoral district of that name existed earlier in the Legislative Assembly of the Province of Canada).  Its final election was in 1919.  It disappeared in the 1923 election and its successor electoral district was Napierville-Laprairie.

Members of the Legislative Assembly
 Pierre Benoit, Liberal (1867–1870)
 Laurent-David Lafontaine, Liberal (1870–1881)
 François-Xavier Paradis, Conservative Party (1881–1886)
 Eugène Lafontaine, Liberal (1886–1890)
 Louis Sainte-Marie, Liberal – Conservative Party (1890–1897)
 Cyprien Dorris, Liberal (1897–1904)
 Dominique Monet, Liberal (1904–1905)
 Cyprien Dorris, Liberal (1905–1918)
 Amédée Monet, Liberal (1918–1923)

References
 Election results (National Assembly)
 Election results (QuebecPolitique.com)

Napierville